Traditional Newar clothing refers to the everyday clothes worn by the Newar people of Nepal who are indigenous to the Kathmandu Valley and surrounding regions. The garments are associated with the old aristocracy, merchants, farmers, craftsmen and professionals.

Most of the clothes are made of homespun. Weaving was a major industry in the Kathmandu Valley. Many people had handlooms in their homes, and in the old days a spinning wheel and a seed separator were one of the required bridal gifts. People wove cloth for personal use or for sale. The finished cloth was sent to be dyed to the dyers who made up a caste group called Chhipa (now Ranjit or Ranjitkar). The practice of home weaving continued till the 1960s. Women warping the yarn on the streets were a common sight till those times.

A description of the clothes worn by ordinary Newars in the early 18th century can be found in the travelogue left by Italian Jesuit Ippolito Desideri. In 1721, Desideri visited Kathmandu on his way from Tibet to India. Describing the clothes of the local people, he has written that they wear a woollen or cotton jacket reaching to the knees and long trousers down to their ankles. They wear a red cap on their head, and slippers on their feet, he wrote.

In 1973, the government of Nepal issued a postage stamp showing a painting of the traditional costume of the Kathmandu Valley as part of a series of stamps of the traditional clothes worn in various regions of Nepal.

Tapālan

Men's common costume consists of a long shirt called tapālan (Nepal Bhasa: तपालं) and tight fitting trousers known as suruwā (सुरुवा:). A waistcoat and coat may be worn over the shirt. Today, the garment is worn during special occasions, official functions and festivals while it is still everyday wear for many among the older generation. Men dress in tapālan and suruwā and women wear the hāku patāsi when taking part in the New Year's Day parade of Nepal Sambat. This traditional dress is also worn during wedding processions.

Hāku patāsi

Women wear black cotton saris with a red border known as hāku patāsi (हाकु पतासि) or hāku parsi (हाकु पर्सि). It is still widely used especially among farmer women as everyday wear and is the most popular dress during festive occasions. A blouse fastened with cloth ties called misālan (मिसालं) is worn with the sari. A shawl, gā (गा), is wrapped around the upper part of the body.

In 1973, Nepal's Postal Services Department issued a commemorative stamp of a woman and a man dressed in haku patāsi and tapālan to show the traditional clothing of the Kathmandu Valley. The stamp was part of a series on the costumes of various parts of Nepal.

Sayn kaytā

Sayn kaytā (सँय कयता) are traditional men's trousers. They were worn mostly by the merchant and courtier classes till the 1930s. The baggy trousers are gathered at the knee and fastened with a piece of string. The trousers feature a drawstring tie waist. The material used to make the sayn kayta is raw silk. A pair requires 6 yards of material. The sayn kayta is worn with a long shirt which is held in place by cloth ties. A cotton cummerbund completes the set.

Parsi

Some classes of Newar women wore plain or printed saris known as parsi (पर्सि). It has many pleats which are gathered at the front and tied in a bunch with a piece of string. These saris were up to 20 yards long.

Bhāntānlan

Girls wear an ankle-length tight-fitting gown known as bhāntānlan (भान्तांलं) which extends from the neck to the ankles. It is smitten at the sides to reveal the legs; the upper part is fastened with cloth ties. Drop crotch pants were another popular item of clothing for girls. They are worn with a knee-length dress.

Ceremonial attire
Special costumes are worn during lifecycle ceremonies like Janku, a baby's first rice feeding, initiation rites, weddings, old-age rituals and investitures. A child undergoing his or her first rice feeding is dressed in a vest and cap made of brocade. Boys celebrating their coming-of-age ceremony wear a loincloth. For Buddhist boys, the corresponding right is Bare Chhuyegu which is an initiation into the monkhood, and they wear a monk's robe. Girls dress up in the fancy attire of silk and brocade in grown-up designs for their Ihi and Baray, two ceremonies they undergo before reaching their teens.

Priests wear ankle-length pleated gowns during special religious services. Caps, turbans and crowns are the headwear worn with ceremonial garments.

Historical gallery

References

Newar culture
Nepalese clothing
History of Asian clothing
Newar
Cultural history of Nepal
Kathmandu